Dayi is a village in the central part of the Daman District, Kandahar Province,  Afghanistan. It borders Landai Killi to the south, Byaban Darah village to the north, Syedan Kalacha to the north and Kandahar Boldak Highway to the west,  The population is 2500 (2013). The center is the village of Daman, located in the central part of the district.  The area is irrigated by the Arghasan River.

The Kandahar International Airport is in the South-West of the village. Its to be mentioned that, the airport is currently focused by US Army.

This village belongs to the family of Nazir Khan S/O Fateh Khan tribe Barakzai sub tribe OmerKhanzai. 
Nazir Khan's three sons Abdul Karim Khan, Jalal Khan, Khan came from Mard Qala a village of Dand District Kandahar to Dayi and settled here. They bought all the land of Dayi (7000 Jaribs approx) from people of Mohammadzai and Sadduzai tribes.

External links
Afghanistan: Improved Roads Unlocks Access to Services and Opportunities (The World Bank, November 14, 2017)
AIMS District map

References 
   1. (pdf) The Helmand Valley Project in Afghanistan: A.I.D. Evaluation Special Study No. 18 C Clapp-Wicek & E Baldwin, U.S. Agency for International Development, published December 1983

Populated places in Kandahar Province